OKI FC Winds was a women's football team which played in Division 1 of Japan's Nadeshiko League. The team was based in Honjō, Saitama Prefecture. It joined the league back in 1994. The club was disbanded in 1999.

Results

Transition of team name
OKI Lady Thunders : 1990 - 1995
OKI FC Winds : 1996 – 1999

External links 

Japanese women's club teams

Women's football clubs in Japan
1976 establishments in Japan
Sports teams in Saitama Prefecture